Uprifosbuvir (MK-3682) is an antiviral drug developed for the treatment of Hepatitis C.  It is a nucleotide analogue which acts as an NS5B RNA polymerase inhibitor. It is currently in Phase III human clinical trials.

References 

Anti–RNA virus drugs
Antiviral drugs